Dangeard is a surname. Notable people with the surname include:

 Louis Dangeard (1898–1987), French geologist and oceanographer
 Pierre Dangeard (1895–1970), French botanist
 Pierre Augustin Dangeard (1862–1947), French botanist and mycologist

French-language surnames